No3 may refer to:

 Number 3
 Nitrate, NO3–